Dallyana Marianela Passailaigue Manosalvas (born October 27, 1980) is an Ecuadorian media personality, athlete, and politician. She is currently a member of the National Assembly representing Guayas Province .

Early life
Dallyana Passailaigue was born in Guayaquil on October 27, 1980, the daughter of former Education Minister . She has a degree in commercial engineering.

She was director of tourism for the Prefecture of Guayas in 2005.

She appeared on the RedTeleSistema sports program Copa.

On Ecuavisa, she was a presenter on the show Así somos. She left this position to study acting in Madrid, at the Jorge Elines Interpretation School, and then in Italy where she studied commedia dell'arte. Afterward, she returned to the network to be part of the Televistazo newscast, where she presented the sports news segment.

Artistic and sports career
Passailaigue has appeared in several Ecuadorian television and film productions. Her first acting role was on the TC Televisión comedy series JSI – Jonathan Sangrera.

In 2004 she entered the Ironman Triathlon in Austria, representing Ecuador and placing seventh. She was the first Ecuadorian woman to participate in the competition, and obtained the best rating for a Latin American woman. Passailaigue is also a motorcycle racer. She participated in the 2015 Copa Loxa competition at the Yahuarcocha race track in Imbabura Province, finishing in third place.

Political life

Before the elections in February 2021, she requested unpaid leave from the assembly so that she could take part in the elections. 42 other members also made the same request including Mónica Alemán, Wilma Andrade,  and Verónica Arias. During her absence her job would be carried out by her substitute.

References

External links

 

1980 births
21st-century Ecuadorian actresses
Ecuadorian female triathletes
Ecuadorian feminists
Ecuadorian television actresses
Ecuadorian television presenters
Women members of the National Assembly (Ecuador)
Female motorcycle racers
Living people
Members of the National Assembly (Ecuador)
Social Christian Party (Ecuador) politicians
Sportspeople from Guayaquil
Ecuadorian women television presenters
21st-century Ecuadorian women politicians
21st-century Ecuadorian politicians